The Battle of Radcot Bridge was fought on 19 December 1387 in medieval England between troops loyal to Richard II, led by court favourite Robert de Vere, and an army captained by Henry Bolingbroke, Earl of Derby. It took place at Radcot Bridge, a bridge over the River Thames, now in Oxfordshire, but then the boundary between Oxfordshire and Berkshire.

Background
The previous year had seen increasing hostility between the young King Richard II and his magnates. This crisis reached a head in November 1386, when the Wonderful Parliament compelled King Richard to remove his chancellor, Michael de la Pole.

According to the 16th-century chronicler Raphael Holinshed:

In the words of a modern English historian:

On Saturday 22 September 1397 Sir Thomas Mortimer was summoned to stand trial as a traitor. Mortimer's alleged crime was the slaying of Thomas Molineux, constable of Chester Castle, at the skirmish at Radcot Bridge in 1387. Molineux had been one of the most important Royal agents in the Chester Palinate, and had been responsible for the daily exercise of de Vere's power in the region. In spite of Richard II's enduring resentment against the killer of his trusted servant, there were deeper political considerations behind the proceedings against a man who had been merely one of many gentry supporters of the Appellants.

In August 1387 King Richard retaliated; he assembled a Council of magistrates at Nottingham and attempted to redefine the royal prerogative so as to render the Wonderful Parliament treasonous. The leaders of the Parliament, including Richard's uncle Thomas of Woodstock, Duke of Gloucester, hit back during the Miraculous or Merciless Parliament of November 1387. During this session, Woodstock and the Earls of Warwick and Arundel submitted an appeal which accused several of Richard's closest friends of routinely deceiving the King for their own profit.

Preparatory events
Richard responded by summoning Woodstock and the other Lords Appellant to the Tower of London; all three refused.

This was open dissent, and both Richard and the Appellants knew the implications of such defiance. According to the author of the Eulogium historiarum, Richard asked Woodstock whether his companions were willing to take arms against him, to which the Duke replied: "we do not rebel or arm ourselves against the King except in order to instruct him".

Pushed further by Richard, who protested that Parliament did not have the right to command a King even in the case of "the meanest kitchen boy", the Duke darkly reminded his nephew of his own standing: "But I am the son of a king".

Fearing deposition, King Richard ordered that the citizens of London should take up arms. De Vere was despatched to Cheshire, where King Richard had assembled an army of five thousand retainers, under the direct command of Sir Thomas Molineux. De Vere now took these southwards towards London.

The battle
The most direct routes to the capital were blocked by Arundel's men, so de Vere decided to cross the Thames at Radcot, near Faringdon. However, the bridge itself was under the guard of Derby's troops; they had also partly dismantled its structure. Undeterred, de Vere gave the command to storm the crossing. At this point, a larger force of Derby's men arrived from the north, effectively surrounding the Cheshiremen. De Vere managed to escape the field, eventually making his way to France; once it was known that he had fled, his army promptly surrendered. Among the handful of casualties was Molyneux himself, who was killed during the abortive attempt to cross the Thames.

Aftermath
After the battle, Woodstock and the other Appellants held a council with Richard at the Tower. Richard had no means of resisting their demands, and it was agreed that a further Parliament should be called in February 1388. The resulting Merciless Parliament saw a full-scale purge of Richard's household.

Notes

External links 
 Royal Berkshire History: The Battle of Radcot Bridge

1387 in Europe
1387 in England
Radcot Bridge
Radcot Bridge 1387
Military history of Oxfordshire
Military history of Berkshire